Užice is a city and the administrative center of the Zlatibor District in western Serbia.

Uzice, Užice, or Úžice may also refer to:

 Úžice (Kutná Hora District), a village and municipality in the Central Bohemian Region, Czech Republic
 Úžice (Mělník District), a village and municipality in the Central Bohemian Region, Czech Republic
 Republic of Užice, a short-lived military mini-state that existed in 1941 in occupied Yugoslavia
 The Republic of Užice, a 1974 Yugoslav film commonly known as Guns of War
 Užice Oblast, one of the Subdivisions of the Kingdom of Yugoslavia#Oblasts (1922–1929)